Samuel Wong is a Hong Kong-born Canadian conductor and ophthalmologist .

Trained at Harvard Medical School and Columbia University College of Physicians and Surgeons, Dr. Wong is an eye surgeon practicing in Manhattan and Brooklyn.

In another career, he has conducted many international orchestras including the New York Philharmonic, Seattle and Houston Symphonies, Toronto and Montreal Symphonies, orchestras in Italy, Spain, Belgium, and Israel.  Wong led the New York Philharmonic in December 1990 after the untimely death of Leonard Bernstein, and replaced Zubin Mehta in Washington D.C. in January 1991 when Maestro Mehta traveled to Israel in an act of solidarity with the Israel Philharmonic during the Persian Gulf War.

References

1963 births
Canadian classical musicians
Canadian musicians of Hong Kong descent
Canadian people of Hong Kong descent
Canadian ophthalmologists
Male conductors (music)
Harvard Medical School alumni
Living people
Alumni of St. Paul's Co-educational College
Columbia University Vagelos College of Physicians and Surgeons alumni
21st-century Canadian conductors (music)
21st-century Canadian male musicians